The Academy of the Arabic Language in Cairo is a language academy for Arabic created in Cairo, Egypt in 1932 by Fuad I of Egypt.

Name 
It was founded as the Royal Academy for the Arabic Language ( majma' al-lughah al'arabiyyah al-malaki) in 1932. In 1938, it became the Fu'ad I Academy for the Language. After the Egyptian revolution of 1952 and the end of the monarchy, it became the Academy of the Arabic Language.

Background 
The academy's first permanent secretary, chronicled in an article entitled [History of the Academy], published in the first issue of the academy's journal in 1934, the attempts of Arab men of letters to establish a regulatory institution for the Arabic language—none of which was successful. 

The Academy of the Arabic Language in Cairo was born out of ideas and movements of late 19th century Egypt, including: Pan-Islamism, Pan-Arabism, and the Nahda. It was modeled after language academies in the Arab world and abroad, most notably the Institut d'Égypte.

Schools 
Dar al-Ulum, established in 1872, educated Azhari scholars in modern sciences. The works of translation produced by institutions like these introduced some of the earliest modern problems for the Arabic language.

Presses 
Muhammad Ali established the Amiri Press or Bulaq Press, the first printing press in Egypt, in 1821. It was followed by others, such as al-Matba'a al-Ahliya al-Qabtiya in 1860, Wadi an-Nil in 1866, Gam'iyat al-Ma'arif in 1868, al-Ahram in 1875, Sharikat Tab' al-Kutub al-'Arabiya 1898.

History 
Establishing a language academy was proposed in Egyptian Parliament in the parliamentary year 1928-1929.

On December 31, 1932 (14 Sha'ban of 1351 of the Hijra), the Academy of the Arabic Language in Cairo was established by royal decree issued from the Abdeen Palace, residence of Fuad I of Egypt. Its constitution was inspired by the constitution of the Académie Française.

The Academy of the Arabic Language in Cairo  was established for the purposes of addressing urgent issues facing the Arabic language and of adapting it to suit the needs of the 20th century. One of the early tasks of the Academy of the Arabic Language in Cairo was to publish a historical dictionary of Arabic, tracing the changes of meanings and uses of Arabic words over time, though this was not achieved.

Selecting the founding members 
King Fuad I of Egypt—who wanted an institute in the image of his regime, in its regard toward modern science and its domestic and foreign interests—played a major role in the selection of the academy's members. The ulama, scholars, and intellectuals he chose were modernists and politically loyalists, moderates, or neutral. These included:

Political figures

 
 Chaim Nahum
 
Academics
 
 
 Ahmad al-'Awāmiri
Azharis
 
 
 
 
Eastern members
 Muhammad Kurd Ali
 
 
 Anastas Al-Karmali
 Hassan Husni Abd al-Wahhab
Orientalists
 H. A. R. Gibb
 Louis Massignon
 Carlo Alfonso Nallino
 August Fischer
 Enno Littmann

Headquarters 
At its inception, the Academy of the Arabic Language in Cairo was housed in the palace of Hussayn Riad at 1 Ibn Arhab Street in Giza, in front of the Egyptian University (now Cairo University). It later moved to 110 , a building that was then demolished to build a bank. It finally moved to a villa at 26 Murad St in Giza.

Inauguration 
The Academy of the Arabic Language in Cairo was inaugurated by Muhammad Hilmi Isa Pasha on January 30, 1934 (14 Shawwal 1352 of the Hijra), with all of the academy's members in attendance with the exception of Hassan Husni Abd al-Wahhab.

Arabic script reform 
In 1936, the academy, prompted by issues arising in the transliteration of names in European scripts into Arabic, discussed the possibility of reforming Arabic script. This discussion was further expanded in 1938 with regard to the technical difficulty of printing vowels in Arabic at the time. The discussions were published to engage a wider audience, and in 1945 a competition with a £E1,000 prize was announced calling for proposals. The discussions continued for a number of years but no plan for reform of Arabic script was endorsed. These discussions did, however, lead to the definition of پ pe and ڤ ve to represent p and v.

, Ahmed Lutfi el-Sayed, and Taha Hussein served as presidents.

 was the first woman to become a member of the Academy of the Arabic Language in Cairo.

References 

1932 establishments in Egypt
Organisations based in Cairo
Arabic lexicology and lexicography
Arabic dictionaries
Arabization
Academy of the Arabic Language in Cairo
Arabic language regulators